Prince Georg of Bavaria (2 April 1880 – 31 May 1943) was a member of the Bavarian Royal House of Wittelsbach and a Catholic priest.

Birth and family 
Georg was born in Munich, Bavaria, the elder son of Prince Leopold of Bavaria and his wife Archduchess Gisela of Austria. The New York Times described him as the favourite grandson of both the Emperor Franz Joseph I of Austria and the Prince Regent Luitpold of Bavaria.

Military career 
Georg entered the Bavarian army as a Second Lieutenant (German: Leutnant) a day before his 17th birthday on 1 April 1897; he was assigned to Infanterie-Leib-Regiment. On 8 February 1903 he was promoted to the rank of First Lieutenant (German: Oberleutnant) and then reassigned to the 1st Royal Bavarian Heavy Cavalry “Prince Charles of Bavaria”. Two years later, on 27 October 1905, he was promoted to Rittmeister and on 26 October 1906 to Major. From 17 August 1908 he was also a Rittmeister and later Major in the 11th "Moravia" Austro-Hungarian Dragoons. While in the army, he became a champion boxer.

Marriage 
In December 1911 Georg became engaged to Archduchess Isabella of Austria (b. 17 November 1888 in Pressburg), daughter of Archduke Friedrich, Duke of Teschen, and his wife, Princess Isabella of Croy. The wedding took place on 10 February 1912 in the Mariä Vermählung (Marriage of the Virgin Mary) Chapel in the Schönbrunn Palace in Vienna, officiated by Cardinal Franz Nagl.

The couple honeymooned in Wales, Paris and Algiers, but separated before the end of the honeymoon. There were several unsuccessful attempts at reconciliation. On 17 January 1913 the union was dissolved by the Royal Bavarian Supreme Court; on 5 March 1913 the union was annulled by the Holy See on the grounds of non-consummation.

Isabella became a nurse in the Austrian army during World War I. During the war, she fell in love with the surgeon Paul Albrecht (1873–1928) and was briefly engaged to him until Emperor Franz Joseph I of Austria forbade the marriage. She never married again, and died in La Tour-de-Peilz, Switzerland on 6 December 1973.

World War I 
During World War I, Georg fought both on the Western Front (including the First Battle of Arras and the First Battle of Ypres) and on the Eastern Front. He started the war as commander of the Bavarian mechanized troops and eventually served under General Erich von Falkenhayn in Palestine. He was awarded both the I and II Class of the Iron Cross and on 14 December 1917 reached the rank of Colonel (German: Oberst).

Ecclesiastical career 
In 1919 Georg resigned his military commission and began studying theology in Innsbruck, Austria. He was ordained a Catholic priest on 19 March 1921 and shortly afterwards received a doctorate in canon law from the Catholic Faculty of Theology at the University of Innsbruck. He continued his religious studies in Rome and in 1925 graduated from the Pontifical Ecclesiastical Academy.

On 18 November 1926 Pope Pius XI named Georg a domestic prelate with the title Monsignor. In the 1930s, Georg was appointed a secular canon at St. Peter's Basilica in Rome. On 12 November 1941 Pope Pius XII named Georg a protonotary apostolic de numero participantium (one of the highest ranks of monsignor).

Throughout his time in Rome, Georg lived at Villa San Francesco with the Franciscan Brothers of Waldbreitbach. He maintained regular contact with his family, including his first cousin Crown Prince Rupprecht of Bavaria who moved to Rome in 1939. He was also in regular contact with other royal and princely houses; in 1930 he attended the Rome wedding of the Prince of Piedmont (later King Umberto II of Italy) to Princess Marie-José of Belgium, and in 1935 he attended the Rome wedding of Infante Jaime of Spain. In 1938, as grand prior of the Sacred Military Constantinian Order of Saint George he arranged the transfer of the remains of King Francis II of the Two Sicilies and of his wife Queen Maria Sophie from Schloss Tegernsee in Bavaria to the Chiesa del Santo Spirito in Rome.

On 31 May 1943 Georg died at Villa San Francesco. One source says that he had been ill for some time. Another source says that he died unexpectedly of tuberculosis contracted while working at a hospital. He is buried in the Campo Santo Teutonico, the German cemetery immediately outside the walls of Vatican City. In his will he left money to pay for new bronze doors for St. Peter's Basilica; these include the "Door of the Dead" by Giacomo Manzù and the "Door of the Sacraments" by Venanzo Crocetti.

Greek succession

A few writers (e.g. Martha Schad ) maintain that after the death of his father in 1930, Georg became the successor to the Greek rights of his great-uncle King Otto of Greece who was deposed in 1862. Georg's uncle Ludwig and his descendants were more senior, but Ludwig had renounced his Greek rights in 1869. However, the Greek Constitution of 1844 required that the successor of King Otto "shall profess the Greek Orthodox religion."

Honours and awards 
Prince Georg was President of the Royal Automobile Club of Bavaria (Königlich Bayerischer Automobil-Club). In 1911 he became Protector of the Bavarian branch of the German Navy League. In 1929 he became a member of the Archconfraternity of the Suffering Mother of God in the Campo Santo Teutonico.

In 1933 a portrait bust of Georg was sculpted by Arno Breker.

Orders and decorations

Ancestry

Notes

Bibliography 
 Marriage. Wiener Zeitung, February 11, 1912, p. 1.
 "The Austro-Bavarian Marriage", The Times, February 10, 1912, p. 5.
 "The Austro-Bavarian Marriage", The Times, February 12, 1912, p. 5.
 "Prince and Bride Part", New York Times, September 20, 1912, p. 4.
 "Prince's Marriage Voided", New York Times, October 7, 1912, p. 1.
 "Won't Annul Marriage", New York Times, October 12, 1912, p. 4.
 "Princess Seeks Divorce", New York Times, November 5, 1912, p. 8.
 "Royal Marriage Has Been Dissolved", New York Times, January 18, 1913, p. 3.
 "Prince George of Bavaria", The Times, January 18, 1913, p. 5.
 "Dissolution of a Royal Marriage", The Times, April 28, 1913, p. 5.
 "Mgr. Prince George of Bavaria Was 63". New York Times, June 2, 1943, p. 25.
 Schad, Martha. Kaiserin Elisabeth und ihre Töchter. München: Langen Müller, 1998.

1880 births
1943 deaths
People from the Kingdom of Bavaria
Clergy from Munich
Princes of Bavaria
House of Wittelsbach
Members of the Bavarian Reichsrat
Knights of the Golden Fleece of Austria
Grand Crosses of the Order of Saint Stephen of Hungary
Recipients of the Iron Cross (1914), 1st class
Recipients of the Iron Cross (1914), 2nd class
Grand Crosses of the Order of the Star of Romania
Annulled Honorary Knights Grand Cross of the Royal Victorian Order
German expatriates in Austria
Military personnel of Bavaria
Austro-Hungarian Army officers
Knights of the Order of Montesa
20th-century deaths from tuberculosis
Tuberculosis deaths in Italy
Infectious disease deaths in Lazio
20th-century German Roman Catholic priests
Burials at the Teutonic Cemetery